Peter Hills Monroe (born August 25, 1943), now an independent, was a Republican U.S. Senate candidate in the U.S. state of Florida. He is a commercial real-estate developer and an attorney. He was an appointee by the first President Bush to a post steering the federal government's bailout of the savings and loan industry.

Monroe earlier had served with United States Secretary of Housing and Urban Development Jack Kemp as the chief operating officer at the Federal Housing Administration (FHA).

Peter Monroe is best known as noted in Willam Seidman's Book "Full Faith and Credit " for serving as president and CEO of the Resolution Trust Corporation Oversight Board – the Federal agency charged with overseeing the $400 billion clean-up of the savings and loan disaster. L. William Seidman in his book entitled Full Faith and Credit described Monroe as "a leader in promoting the RTC's pioneering securitization of commercial mortgages".

Earlier in his career, Monroe held a senior housing position on the immediate staff of HUD Secretary George Romney.

Peter Monroe graduated Phi Beta Kappa from Williams College, was a Rhodes Scholar finalist, graduated with a "first-class"  master's degree from Oxford University, and obtained his law degree from Harvard University.

In 2006, Monroe, then a liberal Republican, sought nomination as the Republicans' Senate candidate in Florida's primary elections. While being endorsed by the Palm Beach Post, the South Florida Sun Sentinel, the Florida Times Union, and the Daytona Beach News Journal, who all recognized Monroe's knowledge of economic matters and expertise in running two federal agencies, and endorsed him in Florida's Republican Senate primary, Monroe lost to Katherine Harris. Monroe believes that he was hampered in his campaign by the fact that he was challenging the very Florida Secretary of State who ordered cessation of the presidential 2004 campaign vote recount in Florida—ultimately leading to a victory by George Bush over Senator Al Gore.

During his campaign, Monroe implored the Florida Congressional delegation, and wrote numerous articles advocating a federal catastrophic insurance program intended to spread natural disaster risk throughout the US.

Monroe, born in Detroit, has deep roots in the automotive industry. His grandfather, Herbert H. Hills, purchased in 1904 the first Buick ever produced, and held senior positions at Buick and Packard Motor Car Company.

See also
 Florida United States Senate election, 2006

References

External links

 Fuelist

1943 births
Living people
Williams College alumni
Alumni of the University of Oxford
Harvard Law School alumni
Florida Republicans
Florida Independents